Haliophis is a genus of ray-finned fishes, the type genus of the subfamily Congrogadinae, the eel blennies, part of the dottyback family, Pseudochromidae. They are found in the Indian Ocean and in the western Pacific Ocean.

Species
The following species are classified in the genus Halidesmus:

 Haliophis aethiopus Winterbottom, 1985 (Bali eelblenny)
 Haliophis diademus Winterbottom & Randall, 1994 (Stars-and-stripes snakelet )
 Haliophis guttatus (Forsskål, 1775) (African eel blenny)

References

Congrogadinae